Philip Patrick Power  (born April 1953) is a Distinguished Professor of Chemistry at the University of California, Davis. He has contributed to the synthesis, structure, and physical and chemical characterization of inorganic and organometallic compounds. His research focuses on low-coordinate main group and transition metal compounds.  Much of this work hinges on the use of sterically crowded ligands to stabilize unusual geometries.

Education
Philip Power obtained a B.A. from University of Dublin in 1974 and a Ph.D. from University of Sussex in 1977 (under Michael F. Lappert). He was a postdoctoral coworker under Richard H. Holm at Stanford University (1978–1980). In 1981 he was appointed to the faculty of UC Davis, where he is Distinguished Professor.

Awards
Alexander von Humboldt Award, 1992
Faculty Research Lecturer, University of Iowa, 1993
Distinguished Visiting Professor, University of Auckland, New Zealand, 1993
Reilly Lectureship, University of Notre Dame, 1995
Werner Lectureship, Trinity College Dublin, 1996
Membership of Editorial Advisory Board of Organometallics, Inorganic Chemistry, Dalton Transactions, Canadian Journal of Chemistry, Heteroatom Chemistry, Journal of Organometallic Chemistry, Polyhedron
Ludwig Mond Award Royal Society of Chemistry, 2004
Associate editor, Inorganic Chemistry, 2004
Sloan Foundation Fellow, 1985–1989
F. A. Cotton Award in Synthetic Inorganic Chemistry, American Chemical Society, 2005
Fellow of the Royal Society, 2005
ACS Award in Organometallic Chemistry, 2011

External links
 UC Davis page

References

Living people
Fellows of the Royal Society
21st-century American chemists
Alumni of the University of Sussex
University of California, Davis faculty
Stanford University fellows
1953 births